Elena Napăr (born 25 January 1977) is a Romanian handball player. She competed in the women's tournament at the 2000 Summer Olympics.

References

1977 births
Living people
Romanian female handball players
Olympic handball players of Romania
Handball players at the 2000 Summer Olympics
Sportspeople from Bucharest